WAV is a computer file format for waveform audio.

Wav or WAV may also refer to:

Arts and entertainment
 Di WAV (born Daniela Carpio), Guatemalan-Swiss singer-songwriter
 WAV 1019 Cebu (DYFM), a Philippine radio station
 WAV 1019 Davao (DXFM), a Philippine radio station

Places
 Wavertree Technology Park railway station, Liverpool, England (by GBR code)
 Wave Hill Airport, Kalkarindji, Australia (by IATA code)
 Warbelow's Air Ventures, a regional airline in Alaska, US (by ICAO code)

Vehicles
 Nikola WAV, an electric, personal watercraft
 UberWAV, Uber's Wheelchair Accessible Van

Other uses
 Waka language, spoken in Nigeria (ISO 639 code: wav)
 Wide Angle Viewing, see Glossary of military abbreviations

See also

 WAVS AM 1170, Davie, Florida, USA
 
 wave (disambiguation)